Bruno Marques Fernandes Pivetti (born 19 February 1984) is a Brazilian football coach.

Career
Born in Campinas, São Paulo, Pivetti started working as an assistant manager and physiologist of Audax's under-15 squad in 2008. He later moved to the under-20s and was subsequently promoted to the main squad under the same role.

On 13 February 2015, Pivetti moved to Atlético Paranaense, being initially appointed manager of the under-19 team. The following 8 January, he was named assistant in the first team, being also an interim manager in March after Cristóvão Borges' dismissal; he was in charge of two matches, one draw and one defeat.

In August 2017, Pivetti was announced as the new assistant of Ferroviária. The following May, after PC de Oliveira's dismissal, he was named interim manager, but opted to leave the club shortly after, after accepting an offer from PFC Ludogorets Razgrad in Bulgaria, to work as Paulo Autuori's assistant. He remained at the club even after Autuori left.

On 6 August 2019, Pivetti was presented as Carlos Amadeu's assistant at Vitória. On 19 June 2020, he was appointed first team manager after the dismissal of Geninho.

Pivetti was sacked from Vitória on 7 October 2020, and was named in charge of Série C side Tombense the following 7 January. On 26 April 2021, he left the club to sign for CSA in the Série B.

On 4 July 2021, Pivetti left CSA on a mutual agreement. On 1 December, he was announced as new manager of Villa Nova, but left the club the following 20 February, after accepting an offer from a Série A club.

On 24 February 2022, Goiás announced the signing of Autuori as coordinator, with Pivetti being named manager. Exactly one month later, after Autuori left, he was sacked.

On 13 May 2022, Pivetti returned to Tombense, in the place of sacked Hemerson Maria. On 9 November, he was named in charge of fellow second division side Chapecoense, but was dismissed the following 18 March.

Managerial statistics

Honours
CSA
Campeonato Alagoano: 2021

References

External links

1984 births
Living people
Sportspeople from Campinas
Brazilian football managers
Campeonato Brasileiro Série B managers
Brazilian expatriate sportspeople in Bulgaria
Club Athletico Paranaense managers
Associação Ferroviária de Esportes managers
Esporte Clube Vitória managers
Tombense Futebol Clube managers
Centro Sportivo Alagoano managers
Villa Nova Atlético Clube managers
Goiás Esporte Clube managers
Associação Chapecoense de Futebol managers